Fiechter is a surname. Notable people with the name include:

Ernst Robert Fiechter (1875–1948), Swiss architect and archaeologist
Jennifer Fiechter (born 1992), Swiss ski mountaineer
Oliver Fiechter (born 1972), Swiss economic philosopher, entrepreneur and author
Olivia Fiechter (born 1995), American squash player

See also
John Fiechter House, also known as Failing Cottage, is a historic house in Benton County, Oregon, United States